Erucastrum rostratum is a species of flowering plant in the family Brassicaceae. It is found only in Yemen. Its natural habitat is rocky areas.

References

Brassicaceae
Endemic flora of Socotra
Least concern plants
Taxonomy articles created by Polbot
Taxa named by Isaac Bayley Balfour